Kolonos is a densely populated working-class district of the Municipality of Athens. It is named after the ancient deme, Hippeios Colonus.

The district hosts a multi-year football club, Attikos F.C., that was founded in 1919.

History
Kolonos is the site of ancient Colonus, a deme of ancient Attica.

References

Neighbourhoods in Athens